Sabatino Enrico 'Nello' Rosselli (Rome, 29 November 1900 – Bagnoles-de-l'Orne, 9 June 1937) was an Italian Socialist leader and historian.

Biography
Rosselli was born in Rome to a prominent Jewish family. His parents were Giuseppe Emanuele "Joe" Rosselli (1867 - 1911) and Amelia Pincherle (1870 - 1954), who was the paternal aunt to writer Alberto Moravia. Nello was the youngest of three sons, the others being Aldo Sabatino (1895 - 1916), died in World War I and Carlo Alberto (1899–1937). Nello was a member of the reformist Unitary Socialist Party of Filippo Turati, Giacomo Matteotti and Claudio Treves, which had split from the PSI. After the rise of Fascism, he fled to France with his brother, and became active there in anti-Fascist and socialist politics, helping to found the group Giustizia e Libertà and aiding the Republicans in the Spanish Civil War, as well as carrying out propaganda missions within Italy.

Murder
In June 1937, Nello went to visit his brother, Carlo, at the French resort town of Bagnoles-de-l'Orne, Orne. On 9 June, the two were killed by a group of cagoulards, militants of the Cagoule, a French fascist group, with archival documents implicating Mussolini's regime in authorizing the murder. The two brothers were buried in the Père Lachaise Cemetery in Paris, but in 1951 the family moved them to Italy into the Monumental Cemetery of Trespiano, a frazione of Florence.

His wife Maria Todesco, their four children Silvia, Paola, Aldo and Alberto, and his mother Amelia Pincherle Rosselli survived him.

References

1900 births
1937 deaths
Politicians from Rome
Jewish Italian politicians
Italian anti-fascists
Assassinated Italian people
Italian people murdered abroad
Deaths by stabbing in France
Unitary Socialist Party (Italy, 1922) politicians
Members of Giustizia e Libertà
20th-century Italian politicians
Terrorism deaths in France
Burials at Père Lachaise Cemetery
Jewish anti-fascists
Exiled Italian politicians
Italian people of the Spanish Civil War
Italian social liberals
20th-century Italian Jews
Jewish socialists
People murdered in France
Assassinated activists
Italian Anti-Francoists